Labeobarbus xyrocheilus is a species of ray-finned fish in the genus Labeobarbus endemic to the Ruo River in Malawi.

References

xyrocheilus
Fish described in 1998